Cadbury Road railway station served the village of Weston in Gordano, Somerset, England from 1907 to 1940 on the Weston, Clevedon and Portishead Railway.

History 
The station opened on 7 August 1907 by the Weston, Clevedon and Portishead Railway. There was a siding to the south during the First World War for supplying manure for the horse stables at Avonmouth. To the north was another siding which served Black Rock and Nightingale Quarries. The station closed on 20 May 1940.

References

External links 

Disused railway stations in Somerset
Railway stations in Great Britain opened in 1907
Railway stations in Great Britain closed in 1940
1907 establishments in England
1940 disestablishments in England